This article is based on a translation of the corresponding article in the German Wikipedia.

Wilhelm Ohnesorge (8 June 1872 – 1 February 1962) was a German politician in the Third Reich who sat in the Hitler Cabinet. From 1937 to 1945, he was the Reichsminister of the Reich Postal Ministry, the German postal service, having succeeded Paul Freiherr von Eltz-Rübenach. Along with his ministerial duties, Ohnesorge also significantly delved into research relating to propagation and promotion of the Nazi Party through the radio, and the development of a proposed German atomic bomb.

Life
Born in Gräfenhainichen, in the Prussian Province of Saxony, Ohnesorge started working for the Imperial Post in 1890. He later went on to study physics in Kiel and Berlin, before he became the head of the postal service in the Imperial Headquarters during World War I. After the war, he became involved in right wing politics and joined the Deutschvölkischer Schutz- und Trutzbund, the largest, most active and most influential anti-Semitic organization in the Weimar Republic.

Ohnesorge first met Hitler sometime in 1920, and they became good friends. Shortly after this, he joined the NSDAP (Party Membership Nr. 42), founding its first local branch (Ortsgruppe) outside Bavaria, at Dortmund. By the year 1929, he had become the president of the Central Office of the Reichspost, Germany's central postal service. With the Nazi takeover in 1933 Ohnesorge was named State Secretary, and he de facto supervised the Reichspost, particularly engaging himself for the propagation of the Nazi Party and their goals through the Post. From 1937, he became the Reichsminister of the Postal Ministry, succeeding Paul Freiherr von Eltz-Rübenach.

Ohnesorge was also intrigued by the possibility of party propagation through wire signals and radio, and became known as something of a technician for his work in making the latter technically possible. He is also known to have contributed heavily to research towards a German atomic bomb, despite his occupation as the minister of the German postal service, which would constantly tax his time. He presented many designs and diagrams of his ideas to Hitler himself, with whom he had developed a personal companionship.

During the denazification after the war, as a leading member of the Party, charges were brought against him. However, for unknown reasons, these charges were later revoked, and Ohnesorge was not penalised for his involvement with the Nazis. His life post-war remains undocumented.

Ohnesorge died at the age of 89 on 1 February 1962 in Munich.

Notes

References
Wilhelm Ohnesorge: Die Deutsche Reichspost in Geschichte und Gegenwart. 1941.
 Rainer Karlsch: Hitlers Bombe''. DVA München, 2005. .
Wilhelm Ohnesorge (postal official)

External links
 

1872 births
1962 deaths
People from Wittenberg (district)
Nazi Germany ministers
Nazi Party officials
Recipients of the Knights Cross of the War Merit Cross